Ocnogyna baetica, also known as Rambur's Pellicle or winter webworm, is a moth of the family Erebidae. The species was first described by Rambur in 1837. It is found in Italy, the Iberian Peninsula and North Africa.

Larvae have been recorded on Hedysarum, Trifolium, Erysimum and Malva.

References

Spilosomina
Moths of Europe
Moths described in 1837